Milan Ilić (born 7 February 2000) is a Serbian football right back who plays for Javor Ivanjica.

Club career

Red Star Belgrade
Ilić signed a three-years contract with Red Star on 5 July 2021.

International career
Ilić debut for Serbia U21 national team was on 6 June 2021 in a friendly match against Russia U21.

References

External links
 

2000 births
Living people
Association football defenders
Serbian footballers
FK Teleoptik players
FK Dinamo Vranje players
FK Loznica players
Serbian First League players
Footballers from Belgrade
Serbia under-21 international footballers